Attorney General Thompson may refer to:

George Thompson (Wisconsin politician) (1918–1982), Attorney General of Wisconsin
John Malbon Thompson (1830–1908), Attorney-General of Queensland
John Sparrow David Thompson (1845–1894), Attorney General of Canada
William T. Thompson (Nebraska politician) (1860–1939), Attorney General of Nebraska

See also
Vernon Wallace Thomson (1905–1988), Attorney General of Wisconsin